Private Number is a 2014 American psychological horror film written and directed by LazRael Lison.  An alcoholic novelist who suffers from writer's block (Hal Ozsan) and his wife (Nicholle Tom) receive repeated, inexplicable crank phone calls that push them to the edge.  It premiered in July 2014 and received a limited release in May 2015.  The DVD was released a month later.

Plot 
Michael Lane, a moderately successful author, experiences writer's block while working on his second novel.  A recovering alcoholic, he credits his wife, Katherine, with saving him from losing everything.  He is tempted to return to drinking when the stressors in his life pile on: he does not get along with his next-door neighbor, Mitch; Katherine wants a baby; he has been subject to a series of prank calls; and he is under pressure by everyone to complete his novel.  He confides to his Alcoholics Anonymous sponsor, Jeff, that he has recently begun experiencing hallucinations again despite his lack of drinking.  Jeff, a psychologist, suggests that the stress in his life may be to blame.

The prank calls continue to wake Michael and Katherine at night, and when an apparent intruder trips their alarm, they contact the police.  Sheriff Stance, who dislikes Michael, dismisses their concerns and insinuates that Michael has begun drinking again.  As pressures on Michael continue to mount, the main character of his previous novel, an English knight, taunts him, and he experiences grisly hallucinations of murdered people.  Michael becomes increasingly tempted to return to his drinking, egged on by the knight.  He only stops himself by looking at a picture of his wife and remembering a pledge to stay sober.

When friends Mary and Bill are over at their house, their son Mason discovers the Lanes' voicemail and plays back the messages left by the crank callers, who repeated the question, "Remember me?"  When Mason refuses to stop playing the messages, Michael strikes him and becomes entranced by the voicemail, from which he claims to hear secret messages when played in reverse.  When Bill and Mary confront him, he initially ignores them while translating the messages, then beats up Bill.  Distressed, Katherine tells him to seek professional help.  After seeing further hallucinations that night, Michael finally drinks an entire bottle of whiskey.  When Katherine finds out, she tells him that she is leaving him.  Michael insists that they are being haunted and that he needs her help.

As Katherine is about to leave, Detective Taylor stops her and jokes that his research into their crank calls has led him to believe they may be of paranormal origin.  Suddenly realizing that Michael may be right, Katherine returns to him, and they research a local unsolved case that involves a serial killer.  Taylor confirms that the names Michael has heard on his voice mail are the killer's victims but cannot help any further, as Sheriff Stance has sealed the case's records and warned him to back off.  Michael hires a local computer repairman to hack into the police records, where he discovers the serial killer uses a different standardized psychological M.O. in each killing.  The sixth and final M.O. has yet to be used, and Michael becomes convinced that the victims' ghosts want him to stop the killer before he strikes again.

The crank calls from the ghosts continue unabated, and Katherine becomes mysteriously ill.  Frustrated, Michael shouts at the ghosts and demands to know who killed them.  Voices from his phone stun Michael as they tell him he did.  Michael initially denies it but experiences a series of flashbacks, where he remembers murdering the victims and planning Katherine's murder.  Before he could finish his plan, he suffered head trauma when one of his victims fought back.  He stumbled out of her house with her manuscript, and, because of his amnesia, assumed that he had written it.  As the memories come back to him, he returns to his previous killer personality and attempts to murder Katherine; the knight once again encourages him.  As she hides from him, the police arrive and take him prisoner.  During the subsequent interrogation, Sheriff Stance threatens to kill Michael.  When Stance backs down, Michael laughs, calls him weak, and says he has only just begun.

Cast 
 Hal Ozsan as Michael Lane
 Nicholle Tom as Katherine Lane
 Judd Nelson as Sheriff Stance
 Tom Sizemore as Jeff
 Ray Stoney as Detective Taylor
 Kyle T. Heffner as Mitch
 Anastasia Roussel as Mary
 Morgan Peter Brown as Bill
 Magnus James Hennessy as Mason
 Gary McDonald as Knight

Production 
Writer-director Lison was inspired by The Ring, The Shining, Sinister, and Mama, all of which he said were more character-driven than traditional horror films.

Release 
Private Number premiered in Beverly Hills on July 17, 2014.  ARC Entertainment gave it a limited theatrical release on May 1, 2015.  It was released on DVD on June 2, 2015, and grossed $136,810 in US sales.

Reception 
Justin Lowe of The Hollywood Reporter wrote that the film awkwardly blends elements of psychological thriller, horror, and mystery into "an ineffective hybrid".  Martin Tsai of the Los Angeles Times wrote, "The film feels like scenes from different screenplays cobbled together without the rough edges polished off."  Michael Gingold of Fangoria rated it 1.5/4 stars and called it predictable but poorly plotted, as the plot twist does not organically flow.  Drew Tinnin of Dread Central rated it 1/5 stars and called it "more soap opera thriller than straight up horror".

References

External links 
 

 

2014 films
2014 horror films
2014 psychological thriller films
American horror thriller films
Films about writers
American ghost films
American serial killer films
American supernatural horror films
American supernatural thriller films
2010s English-language films
2010s American films